Henry Stuart may refer to:

Members of the Royal House of Stuart 
 Henry Stuart, Lord Darnley (1545–1567), King Consort of Scotland, cousin and second husband of Mary, Queen of Scots, father of James VI of Scotland
 Henry Frederick, Prince of Wales (1594–1612), elder brother of Charles I of England and Prince of Wales from 1603 to 1612
 Henry Benedict Stuart (1725–1807), known as Cardinal Duke of York and King Henry IX, younger brother of Bonnie Prince Charlie
 Henry Stuart, Duke of Gloucester (1640–1660), Protestant younger brother of Charles II and James II of England

Others 
 Henry Stuart (MP) (1804–1854), English MP for Bedford
 Henry Stuart (priest) (1864–1933), Anglican Dean of Carlisle
 Henry Carter Stuart (1855–1933), early twentieth century governor of Virginia
 Henry Stuart (actor) (1885–1942), British-Swiss film actor
 Henry Stuart (Australian politician) (1853–1910), New South Wales politician

See also
Henry Stewart (disambiguation)